Triad Stage is a regional theatre located at 232 South Elm Street, Greensboro, North Carolina.

History 
Triad Stage began as the dream of creating a professional not-for-profit regional theater to serve the communities of the Triad. Co-founders Preston Lane and Richard Whittington forged their artistic partnership as graduate students at the Yale School of Drama. After managing a theater in Connecticut for two years, they undertook the three-year task of opening their own theater in the heart of historic Greensboro.

In September 1999, Triad Stage purchased the former Montgomery Ward building, which had been built in 1936 and vacant for almost 40 years. Renovations began in spring 2001, transforming the five-story building into a world-class theater center (now called The Pyrle Theater) complete with a 300-seat live performance space, rehearsal hall, offices, two spacious lobbies, special events areas and other audience amenities.

The grand opening of the theater took place in January 2002 with Tennessee Williams' modern classic Suddenly, Last Summer. Since then, Triad Stage has produced over 100 productions and has sold over 500,000 tickets.

In 2008, Triad Stage finished a second round of renovations to The Pyrle. A scene shop annex was added in the basement. The top floor underwent major construction to turn what was previously a storage center into the 80-seat Upstage Cabaret performance space, the Sloan Rehearsal Hall and the studio and office facilities of WUNC North Carolina Public Radio's Greensboro Bureau.

In 2011, Triad Stage purchased a  building near the Greensboro Coliseum Complex to serve as the theater's new production facility, relocating its scene, costume and properties shops as well as its warehouse.

In 2013, Triad Stage embraced its name and the spirit of Triadism by expanding its season to include shows in Winston-Salem. This rare dual-city model in now a core component of Triad Stage's season programming.

Now in its 17th anniversary season, Triad Stage has 3,000 season passholders and more than 700 annual donors.

Awards 
The theater company has received accolades on the national, state and local levels, including being named "One of the Best Regional Theaters in America" by New York's Drama League, voted the Triad's "Best Live Theater" by the readers of the News & Record's GoTriad thirteen years in a row and "Professional Theatre of the Year" by the North Carolina Theatre Conference twice. Its production of Tobacco Road was listed among the "Best of 2007" by The Wall Street Journal. Triad Stage has been spotlighted in American Theatre, Stage Directions, Southern Living, Playbill.com, Our State and UNC-TV's "North Carolina Weekend". The American Theatre Wing, founder of the Tony Awards, named Triad Stage "one of the top ten most promising theatres in the country" as the recipient of a 2010 National Theatre Company Grant.

Triad Stage has been further honored with the award of grants from the National Endowment for the Arts and The Shubert Foundation.

The Pyrle Theater 
Triad Stage named its theater building after Greensboro resident Pyrle Gibson.

Founders 
Preston Lane (artistic director and co-founder) is in his 17th season at Triad Stage where he has directed over 50 productions, including Triad Stage's Grand Opening production Suddenly Last Summer, the acclaimed Tobacco Road, and over 20 adaptations and original World Premiere productions, including his collaborations with Laurelyn Dossett: Brother Wolf, Beautiful Star, Bloody Blackbeard, Providence Gap, Snow Queen, and Radiunt Abundunt.

Preston is the recipient of the 2008 Betty Cone Medal of the Arts. He was formerly the Artistic Partner for Theatre for An Appalachian Summer Festival and the Artistic Associate at the Dallas Theater Center, where his productions included the US premiere of Inexpressible Island (Dallas Observer Best of Dallas Awards: Best Director, Best Production) and The Night of the Iguana (Dallas Morning News:2002 Top Ten Theatre List). Other productions include work Off Broadway, Regional and the National Black Theatre Festival.

As a playwright, his adaptations and original works include: A Doll House, Masquerade, A Christmas Carol, Tartuffe, Ghosts, Hedda Gabler, Dracula, Mirandolina, Julie's Dance, Common Enemy, Don Juan, Actions and Objectives; A Christmas Carol (Dallas Theater Center, Sonoma County Rep, Kids Who Care and Triad Stage), Three Weeks After Marriage and Helen! (Yale Summer Cabaret) and with Laurelyn Dossett: Brother Wolf (Triad Stage, An Appalachian Summer Festival, The Human Race Theatre Company and St. Olaf College), Beautiful Star (Triad Stage and WaterTower Theatre), Bloody Blackbeard and Providence Gap, Brother Wolf. Beautiful Star and Ghosts are published by Playscripts Inc.

He has taught at UNC-G, NC A&T, NCSA, Greensboro College, SMU, and the Professional Actors Workshop at the Dallas Theater Center. He is an alumnus of the Drama League of New York's Director's Project. A native of Boone, NC, Preston received his MFA from the Yale School of Drama.

Richard Whittington (managing director and co-founder) has served as managing director of Triad Stage since its inception. Whittington earned a MFA in Theatre Management from the Yale School of Drama and has a BFA in Acting and Directing from Marymount Manhattan College. In 2007, he was appointed by the governor to serve on the board of the NC Arts Council where he is a member of the executive committee. He has previously served on the boards of ArtsNC and Downtown Greensboro, Inc. and has served on numerous grant panels throughout the state as well as for the National Endowment for the Arts.

Whittington has taught Theatre Management at Greensboro College and NC A&T University and has guest-lectured at UNC Chapel Hill, NC School of the Arts, Wake Forest University and UNC Greensboro. A native of Dallas, Texas, Rich previously served as managing director for the Ensemble Company for the Performing Arts (ECPA), as artistic administrator for the Dallas Theater Center and Associate Producer of Dallas' The Big D Festival of the Unexpected. Prior experience also includes work at the Roundabout Theatre in New York and StageWest in Springfield, Massachusetts.

Lane and Whittington were honored with Downtown Greensboro Inc.'s 2010 J. Edward Kitchen Leadership Award by for their effective and persistent leadership resulting in making significant improvements in Greensboro's center city.

References

External links
 

 Go Triad, Greensboro's Arts News Magazine covers Providence Gap creators Preston Lane and Laurelyn Dossett
 Musicians of Providence Gap on WUNC Radio's State of Things
 Yes! Weekly interviews artistic director Preston Lane and his mother for Mother's Day 2010
 Managing director of Triad Stage Rich Whittington stands up for local arts funding in Greensboro
 Common Enemy, From Page to Stage digital booklet.

Theatre companies in North Carolina
Regional theatre in the United States
Culture of Greensboro, North Carolina
Tourist attractions in Greensboro, North Carolina
Theatres in Greensboro, North Carolina